The Native Arts and Cultures Foundation (NACF) is a 501(c)(3) nonprofit organization that supports Native American artists, culture bearers, and Native-led arts organizations, providing them with support through fellowships and project funding. This philanthropic organization exclusively supports American Indian, Alaska Native, and Native Hawaiian arts and cultures in the United States.

Founding and history 
The Native Arts and Cultures Foundation, founded in 2008, is funded by contributions from the public, foundations, corporations, and affiliated organizations. It was launched with a $10 million commitment from the Ford Foundation, following a feasibility study demonstrating the need and interest in such an endowment. The Rumsey Band of Wintun Indians near Sacramento, California, committed an additional $1.5 million.

Walter Echo-Hawk (Pawnee) was the founding Chairman of the Board of Directors. Other founding board members were Joy Harjo (Muscokee) poet and musician; Elizabeth Woody (Warm Springs/Wasco/Navajo), writer and cultural specialist from the Warm Springs Reservation; Marshall McKay (Wintun), Chairman of the Rumsey Rancheria; Letitia Chambers, a private consultant of Cherokee descent, and Buffy St. Marie (Piapot Cree), the singer/activist.

Artist Fellowships 
The NACF awards several Fellowships for Native American Artists working in both traditional and contemporary arts. These include the National Artist Fellowship, Regional Arts Fellowships, and the Mentor Artist Fellowship. As of 2019, the Foundation has supported over 300 individual artists and arts organizations spanning 32 states.

Mentor Artist Fellows 

2018 

 Aurolyn Renee Stwyer
 Bryan Akipa
 Jason Garcia
 Kathleen Carlo Kendall
 Lily Hope
 Lisa Telford
 Patrick William Kruse
 Will Wilson

2017 

 Cara Romero
 Delbert “Smutcoom” Miller
 Delina White
 Dyani White Hawk
 Jackson Polys
 Lani Hotch
 Laura Wong-Whitebear
 Nicholas Galanin
 Royce Manuel
 Shirod Younker
 TahNibaa Naataanii
 Wayne “Minogiizhig” Valliere

National Artist Fellows 
2018 

 Allison Akootchook Warden
 Anthony Hudson / Carla Rossi
 Bently Spang
 Brian Adams
 Cary Morin
 Ciara Leina`ala Lacy
 Courtney M. Leonard
 Elizabeth Woody
 Frank Waln
 Heid E. Erdrich
 Jeff Peterson
 Jim Denomie
 Kalani Pe’a
 Linda Infante Lyons
 Luci Tapahonso
 Marques Hanalei Marzan
 Melissa S. Cody
 Michael Wasson
 Pōhaku Kaho`ohanohano
 RYAN! Feddersen

2016 

 Aaron J. Sala
 Brenda Mallory
 Bunky Echo-Hawk
 Cannupa Hanska Luger
 Erica Tremblay
 Kelli Jo Ford
 Laura Ortman
 Luzene Hill
 Mark Keali`i Ho`omalu
 Mateo Romero
 Preston Singletary
 Susan Power
 Thea Hopkins
 Theresa Secord
 Tiokasin Ghosthorse
 TJ Young

2015 

 Anna Tsouhlarakis
 Clarissa Rizal
 David A. Boxley
 Frank Big Bear
 James Luna
 Kelly Church
 Laura Da’
 Layli Long Soldier
 Lehua Kalima
 Linda Hogan
 Martha Redbone
 Starr Kalāhiki
 Stephen Qacung Blanchett

Upper Midwest Artist Fellowships 
2015

 Amelia Cornelius
 April Stone
 Bennett Brien
 Dyani White Hawk
 Jim Denomie
 Maggie Thompson
 Pat Kruse

2014

 Delina White
 Jennifer M. Stevens
 Kevin Pourier
 Star Wallowing Bull

References 

501(c)(3) organizations
2008 establishments in the United States
Arts organizations established in 2008
Native American culture
Native American organizations
Non-profit organizations based in Washington (state)